Catrin Ana Finch is a Welsh harpist, arranger and composer. She was the Official Harpist to the Prince of Wales from 2000 to 2004 and is visiting professor at the Royal Welsh College of Music & Drama and the Royal Academy of Music in London. Finch has given recitals at venues throughout the world.

Early life
Catrin Finch was born in Llanon, Ceredigion, and began learning the harp at the age of six. Her mother is German and her father English, and she is a fluent Welsh speaker. By the age of nine, she had passed her grade VIII harp examination. She was a member of the National Youth Orchestra of Great Britain at the age of ten, becoming the youngest of its members to play at The Proms. She studied harp with Elinor Bennett, who would become her mother-in-law, before attending the Purcell School, a specialist music school for children in Hertfordshire. She continued her studies at the Royal Academy of Music in London where she studied harp with Skaila Kanga.

During the 1990s, Finch won several competitions for young harpists, including the Nansi Richards Prize and the Blue Riband at the National Eisteddfod of Wales.

Career
Finch's award-winning musical career began in 1999, when she won the Lily Laskine International Harp Competition in France. In 2000, she won the Young Concert Artists International Auditions in New York City, subsequently performing at London's Wigmore Hall. She was later appointed Official Harpist to the Prince of Wales, an office reinstated by Prince Charles and which had been vacant since the reign of Queen Victoria. She continued in the post from 2000 to 2004.

In 2003, Finch presented Charlie’s Angel, an award-winning television documentary about her career, broadcast on BBC Wales.

In recognition of her musical achievements, Finch has been awarded with several academic honours starting with an honorary fellowship from the University of Wales in 2006, as well as honorary fellowships from the University of Wales and the Royal Welsh College of Music & Drama in 2005. She is a visiting professor at the Royal Welsh College of Music and Drama and the Royal Academy of Music.

In 2010, Finch appeared as part of the BBC children's television series ZingZillas, performing a lullaby composed by Chris Banks and Wag Marshall-Page entitled "Drift Away", alongside the other members of the ZingZillas band. The performance was used in series 1, episode 10 of the show, entitled "Sweet Dreams".

2011 saw Finch produce Annwn where she arranged, performed and for the first time provided vocals on a number of tracks influenced by Welsh mythology, an interest of hers since she was young. Featuring a collection of traditional Welsh music, many tracks are newly arranged by Finch in a contemporary style, borrowing from jazz as well as electronic ambient music. The album title refers to Annwn, the Otherworld in Welsh mythology.

In 2015, Finch toured Patagonia with the BBC National Orchestra of Wales, taking her family with her.

In 2016, Finch performed on the recording of Cantata Memoria by Karl Jenkins, a choral with orchestra piece dedicated to the children who perished in the 1966 Aberfan disaster. The haunting music contains the hymn All Things Bright and Beautiful and also features vocals from Bryn Terfel.  The piece premiered at the Aberfan Memorial Concert at the Wales Millennium Centre which also featured spoken-word pieces from Michael Sheen and Sian Phillips. Finch's composition Future Strings from the album Clychau Dibon, which Catrin had written with Seckou Keita, was sampled by Guy Chambers, long-term songwriter to Robbie Williams who heard it played on Desert Island Discs program on BBC Radio 4 .

In 2018 Finch released her second album with Senegalese kora player Seckou Keita, entitled SOAR. Reviewing it for the London Evening Standard, Simon Broughton described the work: "A sublime duo of two artists who are masters of their instruments... musicality and architecture at work." Robin Denselow in The Guardian said: "an intriguing collaboration that really works... the interaction is remarkable…an elegant, gently exquisite set".

Until 2017 Finch and her former husband Hywel Wigley jointly ran Acapela Studio, a recording facility and venue in a converted chapel in Pentyrch, near Cardiff.

Personal life
In 2003, Finch married the music and television producer Hywel Wigley, son of the former Plaid Cymru leader Lord Dafydd Wigley and the harpist Elinor Bennett. They have two children together. The couple formally separated in 2017. On 14 December 2019, Finch married her partner Natalie in Tenby.

In February 2018 Finch announced on that she had been diagnosed with grade 3 breast cancer. She was given the all-clear in October 2018 following treatment at Velindre Cancer Centre, Cardiff.

Discography

Bach, J.S.: Goldberg Variations, BWV 988 (2009)
Crossing the Stone (2003)
Carnaval de Venise (2001)
The Harpist
Catrin Finch Live
Unexpected Songs (2006) (with cellist Julian Lloyd Webber)
String Theory
Little Angels
Catrin Finch, Harp Recital
From Coast to Coast
Annwn (2011)
Drift Away (Not released – in conjunction with "ZingZillas")
Blessings (2012) (with John Rutter)
Clychau Dibon (2013) (with Seckou Keita)
Lullabies (2013)
Tides (2015)
SOAR (2018) (with Seckou Keita)
Echo (2022) (with Seckou Keita)

References

External links

 
 Catrin Finch biography from BBC Wales

Living people
Members of the Household of the Prince of Wales
People from Ceredigion
Welsh harpists
Welsh-speaking musicians
Welsh classical composers
Women harpists
Welsh women musicians
20th-century Welsh musicians
20th-century British women musicians
21st-century Welsh musicians
21st-century British women musicians
Academics of the Royal Welsh College of Music & Drama
Academics of the Royal Academy of Music
1980 births
Welsh LGBT musicians
Welsh women academics